Maryam M. Shanechi is an Iran-born American neuroengineer. She studies ways of decoding the brain's activity to control brain-machine interfaces. She was honored as one of MIT Technology Review's Innovators under 35 in 2014 and one of the Science News 10 scientists to watch in 2019. She is Associate Professor and Viterbi Early Career Chair in Electrical and Computer Engineering at the Viterbi School of Engineering, and a member of the Neuroscience Graduate Program at the University of Southern California.

Early life and career 
Shanechi was born in Iran and moved to Canada with her family when she was 16. She received her bachelor's degree in engineering from the University of Toronto in 2004. She then moved to MIT, where she completed her master's degree in electrical engineering and computer science in 2006 and her PhD in 2011. She completed a postdoc at Harvard Medical School before moving to the University of California, Berkeley, in 2012. She held a faculty position at Cornell University, before moving to the University of Southern California, where she is currently an associate professor and Viterbi Early Career Chair within the USC Viterbi School of Engineering.

Research 
While pursuing her graduate degree at MIT, Shanechi became interested in decoding the brain, the idea of reading out the original meaning from brain signals. She developed an algorithm to determine where a monkey wanted to point the cursor on a screen based on the animal's brain activity. She later improved upon her work by including high-rate decoding, meaning the decoding happened over a few milliseconds, rather than every 100 milliseconds, which is the standard for traditional methods. More recently, the Shanechi Lab has developed novel methods that can dissociate those dynamics in neural activity that are most predictive of behavior and can significantly improve decoding. Her lab has also developed methods that can simultaneously use multiple spatiotemporal scales of neural measurements to model their relationships and improve decoding.

In 2013, she developed a brain decoding method that could help automatically control the amount of anesthesia that is to be administered to a patient. Her team, which included colleagues from Massachusetts General Hospital and Massachusetts Institute of Technology was able to control the depth of the medically-induced coma in rodents automatically based on their brain activity.

Shanechi is also interested in the application of neural decoding algorithms to psychiatric disorders, such as PTSD and depression. Her research team developed a method to decipher the mood of a person from their brain activity. They measured the brain activity of seven patients who had electrodes implanted in their brain to monitor epilepsy. The patients answered questions about their mood while the electrodes were implanted. Using the data about the mood and the brain activity, Shanechi's lab was able to match the two together and decipher which brain activity was related to which mood. The paper on this work was awarded the 3rd prize in the International BCI Awards. Her lab has also developed a stochastic stimulation and modeling approach that can predict the response of multi-regional brain networks implicated in neuropsychiatric disorders to ongoing deep brain stimulation (DBS). In the future, Shanechi wants to develop these techniques in order to stimulate the brain automatically when a change in mood is detected.

Awards 

 NIH Director's New Innovator Award, 2020
 Science News 10 Scientists to Watch, 2019
 Popular Science Brilliant 10, 2015
 MIT Technology Review Innovators Under 35, 2014
NSF CAREER Award, 2015
Office of Naval Research Young Investigator Award, 2019
American Society for Engineering Education (ASEE) Curtis W. McGraw Research Award, 2021
Multidisciplinary University Research Initiative (MURI) Award, 2016 
Mid-Career Achievement Award, University of Toronto Engineering, 2019

Selected publications 
Shanechi's publications include:

References 

1980s births
Living people
American women neuroscientists
American neuroscientists
Iranian neuroscientists
Iranian women engineers
Iranian electrical engineers
University of Southern California faculty